List of chairmen of the People's Assembly of the Republic of Dagestan.

The People's Assembly of Dagestan succeeded the Supreme Council as the legislature in 1995.

This is a list of chairmen (speakers) of the Supreme Council 1990–1995:

This is a list of chairmen (speakers) of the People's Assembly of the Republic of Dagestan from 1995:

References

Lists of legislative speakers in Russia
Chairmen